St. Bartholomew’s Church, or St Bart's, may refer to:

Churches

Australia
St Bartholomew's Church, Burnley, Melbourne, Victoria
 St Bartholomew's Church, Norwood, Adelaide, South Australia
St Bartholomew's Anglican Church and Cemetery, Prospect, New South Wales

Belgium
St Bartholomew's Church, Liège

Canada
St. Bartholomew's Anglican Church (Ottawa)

Czech Republic
Cathedral of St. Bartholomew (Plzeň)
St. Bartholomew's Church, Vrahovice

Germany
St. Bartholomew's Church, Berchtesgaden
Frankfurt Cathedral, also called Saint Bartholomew's Cathedral

India
St Bartholomew's Church (Chorão Island), Goa State

Italy
San Bartolomeo all'Isola, Rome
Saint Bartholomew, Brugherio

Malta
Church of St Bartholomew, Għargħur
St Bartholomew's Chapel, Rabat
St Bartholomew's Chapel, Żurrieq

Philippines
San Bartolome Church (Malabon), Metro Manila
San Bartolome Apostol Parish Church, known as Nagcarlan Church, Laguna
San Bartolome Church (Magalang), Pampanga

Slovenia
St. Bartholomew's Church (Ljubljana)

United Kingdom
St Bartholomew-the-Great, City of London
St Bartholomew-the-Less, City of London
St Bartholomew's Church, Armley, Leeds, West Yorkshire
St Andrew and St Bartholomew's Church, Ashleworth, a church in Gloucestershire with a hagioscope
St Bartholomew's Church, Barbon, Cumbria
St Bartholomew's Church, Barrow, Cheshire
St Bartholomew's Church, Burwash, East Sussex
St Bartholomew's Church, Edgbaston, Birmingham, England
St Bartholomew's Church, Brighton
St Bartholomew's Church, Chipping, Lancashire
St Bartholomew's Church, Church Minshull, Cheshire
St Bartholomew's Church, Colne, Lancashire
St Bartholomew's Church, Furtho, Northamptonshire
St Bartholomew's Church, Goodnestone, Kent
St Bartholomew's Church, Great Harwood, Lancashire
St Bartholomew's Church, Greens Norton, Northamptonshire
St Bartholomew's Church, Haslemere, Surrey
St Bartholomew's Church, Longnor, Staffordshire
St Bartholomew's Church, Lostwithiel, Cornwall
St Bartholomew's Church, Lower Basildon
Old St Bartholomew's Church, Lower Sapey, Worcestershire
St Bartholomew's Church, Newbiggin-by-the-Sea, Northumberland
St Bartholomew's Church, Orford, Suffolk
St Bartholomew's Chapel, Oxford
St Bartholomew's Chapel, Rochester
St Bartholomew's Church, Penn, West Midlands
St Bartholomew's Church, Quorn, Leicestershire
St Bartholomew's Church, Richard's Castle, Herefordshire
St Bartholomew's Church, Sealand, Flintshire, North Wales
St Bartholomew's Church, Thurstaston, Wirral
St Bartholomew's Church, Tong, Shropshire
St Bartholomew's Church, Wilmslow, Cheshire
St Bartholomew's Church, Winchester, Hampshire

United States

St. Bartholomew's Episcopal Church (Atlanta), an Episcopal parish in Atlanta, Georgia
St. Bartholomew's Church (Burroughs, Georgia), a National Register of Historic Places listing in Chatham County, Georgia
St. Bartholomew's Episcopal Church (Quantico, Maryland),  historic Episcopal church at Quantico, Wicomico County, Maryland
St. Bartholomew's Protestant Episcopal Church and Rectory, a historic Episcopal church and rectory in Crown Heights, Brooklyn, New York
St. Bartholomew's Episcopal Church (Manhattan) or St. Bart's, a historic Episcopal parish in Midtown Manhattan, New York
St. Bartholomew's Anglican Church (Tonawanda, New York)
St. Bartholomew's Episcopal Church (Montgomery, Vermont), a historic building in Montgomery, Vermont

See also
 St. Bartholomew, was one of the twelve apostles of Jesus Christ
 St. Bartholomew's (disambiguation)
 St. Bartholomew's Anglican Church (disambiguation)
 Covenham St Bartholomew, a village in Lincolnshire, England, United Kingdom
 Saint-Barthélemy (disambiguation)
 Bartholomew (disambiguation)